

Presidential

Senate 
Popular Incumbent Evan Bayh won by a considerably large margin, even as George W. Bush won this state by 20 points at the national level.

House

Governor 

Incumbent Joe Kernan lost in an upset against Mitch Daniels (former Director of the Office of Management and Budget under George W. Bush), this was the first time that the Republicans had held the office in 16 years, and that the Republican Party had control of most of the most important statewide offices

Attorney General 
Incumbent Republican Steve Carter won with 59% of the vote against Democrat Joseph Hogsett (former Secretary of State and Chair of the Indiana Democratic Party)

References